Hymenogadus gracilis, also known as the Graceful grenadier is a species of rattail fish.
It is a slender fish with a large mouth, with rows of very small teeth, positioned in the underside of the skull. There is a short, thin chin barbel. It is more strikingly marked than most rattails, with bold black streaks on the head and black and silver barring over most of the body. There is a long bioluminescent organ with two lenses underneath the rear end of the body.

References

Macrouridae
Fish described in 1920